Andrea Jayne Stadnyk (born 1977) is a Canadian international lawn bowler.

Bowls career
Stadnyk has represented Canada at the Commonwealth Games, in the triples at the 2006 Commonwealth Games.

She won a silver medal at the 2003 Asia Pacific Bowls Championships in Brisbane.

References

Canadian female bowls players
1977 births
Living people
Bowls players at the 2006 Commonwealth Games
21st-century Canadian women